Nikolaus Presnik (born 6 April 1962), better known as Nik P., is an Austrian schlager singer.

Biography
Born in Friesach, Nik P. moved to Straßburg, Austria with his family after the death of his mother. He learned to play the guitar at a young age and at age 19 he established—together with his cousin Gottfried Notsch—the musical group Reflex, playing local gigs. He met producer Klaus Bartelmuss recording his first studio album Gebrochenes Herz as 'Nik P und Band' in 1997. His debut single was "Dream Lover". 

In 2005, Nik P. separated from Reflex and his album Lebenslust und Leidenschaft was certified platinum in Austria. In 2007, the song "Ein Stern (...der deinen Namen trägt)", performed by Nik P. and DJ Ötzi, became a big commercial success, peaking at number 1 in Austria, Germany and Switzerland. It was certified platinum both in Austria and Germany and gold in Switzerland. In 2008, based on this success, he won the Echo Music Prize for "Single of the Year" for the song.

Discography

Albums
Studio albums

Live albums

Compilation albums

Remix albums

Christmas albums

Singles

Featured in

Other singles with Reflex
 1997: "Gloria"
 1999: "Weil wir tief im Herzen Kinder sind"
 2001: "Ireen" 
 2001: "Die erste Nacht mit dir" 
 2002: "Holiday"

Other singles (solo)
 1998: "Flieg weisser Adler"
 2003: "Größer als alles"
 2006: "Summerwine & Coconut"
 2008: "Gloria II"
 2008: "Leb deinen Traum"
 2009: "Hundertmal..."
 2013: "Berlin"
 2013: "Hitmedley"
 2016: "Da oben"
 2016: "Lass uns unendlich sein"
 2017: "Dieser Ring"

DVDs
 2010: Nik P. & Band live – Ein Stern der deinen Namen trägt
 2015: Löwenherz – Live

References

20th-century Austrian male singers
1962 births
Living people
21st-century Austrian male singers